Naved Malik (born 28 January 1986) is a Pakistani former cricketer who played for Rawalpindi cricket team. He played in 74 first-class, 60 List A and 62 Twenty20 matches between 2006 and 2019. In January 2015, he scored an unbeaten 179 runs in a List A match against Zarai Taraqiati Bank Limited.

References

External links
 

1986 births
Living people
Pakistani cricketers
Rawalpindi cricketers
Cricketers from Rawalpindi